The 2008–09 PFF League was the 5th season of Pakistan Football Federation League, second tier of Pakistan Football Federation. The season started on 28 December 2008 concluded on 11 March 2009.

Departmental Leg

Group A

Group B

Semi-finals

Final

Club Leg

Group A

Group B

Semi-finals

Final

Grand-Final

References

Pakistan Premier League
Football leagues in Pakistan
2008–09 in Pakistani football